The 1949 Wyoming Cowboys football team was an American football team that represented the University of Wyoming as a member of the Skyline Six Conference during the 1949 college football season.  In their third season under head coach Bowden Wyatt, the Cowboys compiled a 9–1 record (5–0 against Skyline Six opponents), won the Skyline Six championship, shut out six of ten opponents while averaging 38 points per game, and outscored all opponents by a total of 381 to 65. The conference championship was the first in the program's history.

On November 5, 1949, the Cowboys defeated  in Greeley by a score of 103 to 0. The team established the program's single-game records that still stand for points scored (103), touchdowns (15) rushing yardage (504), and total yards (871).

Four Wyoming players were named to the Skyline Six All-Star team selected by the conference coaches for the Associated Press: tackle Charles Peterson; center Fred Taucher; fullback Walker "Sonny" Jones; and halfback Eddie Talboom. Carl Rollins was the team captain.

In 2000, Talboom, who played with the Cowboys from 1948 to 1950, became the first Wyoming player to be inducted into the College Football Hall of Fame. Head coach Bowden Wyatt was also inducted into the College Football Hall of Fame as a coach in 1997.

Schedule

References

Wyoming
Wyoming Cowboys football seasons
Mountain States Conference football champion seasons
Wyoming Cowboys football